A Certain Magical Index is a Japanese light novel series written by Kazuma Kamachi and illustrated by Kiyotaka Haimura. The first volume of the series was published in Japan by ASCII Media Works under their Dengeki Bunko imprint on April 10, 2004, and the twenty-second and final volume was released on October 10, 2010. Two short stories for the series, titled A Certain Magical Index SS, were published in Japan on July 10, 2007, and on November 10, 2008. The series was licensed by Yen Press for English publication in North America on April 19, 2014, with the first volume published on November 18 and the final volume on March 24, 2020.

A sequel to the series, titled A Certain Magical Index: New Testament, published its first volume in Japan on March 10, 2011, and concluded with its twenty-third volume on July 10, 2019. The third sequel, titled A Certain Magical Index: Genesis Testament, published its first volume in Japan on February 7, 2020. , a total of seven volumes have been published for Genesis Testament.



Main series

A Certain Magical Index (2004–2010)

A Certain Magical Index: New Testament (2011–2019)

A Certain Magical Index: Genesis Testament (2020–present)

Short stories

A Certain Magical Index SS (2007–2008)

A Certain Magical Index SP (2011)

A Certain Magical Index: Apocrypha Archive (2020)

Short stories bundled in Blu-ray and DVD release

Spin-off

A Certain ITEM of Dark Side

Crossover

A Certain Magical Index × Cyber Troopers Virtual-On: A Certain Magical Virtual-On

References

External links
Toaru Majutsu no Index official website 

Certain Magical Index, A
A Certain Magical Index